Darai people (Nepali:दरै) are an indigenous ethnic tribal community native to Nepal. Most of their population live in hills and inner terai of Nepal in the banks of Narayani river and Madi river with the largest concentration in Chitwan, Tanahu and  Nawalparasi districts.

Culture and language
Darai people have their distinct language belonging to Tibeto-Burman group. 

Most of them follow Hinduism and celebrate festivals such as Tihar(called Sohorai), Jarmathi, Teej, Amawsha, Badkibhat, Faguwa, Ghata Naach and Dashain.

Darai people use earthen pots for daily works, such as to carry water and prepare alcoholic drinks. They use limited metal tools made of iron, bronze, copper and aluminium. They also build a distinct house called Ghumaune Ghar.

Origin
There are various theory on the origin of Darai people. They are believed to be the inhabitant of Terai region in the banks of Narayani river since several thousand years. Another theory is that they are the Indian Rajputs migrants who came to Nepal to escape Muslim invasion of India. Some theorize they came from Darbhanga of India, hence the name Darai. Next theory is that Prithvi Narayan Shah divided the Karnali region into various daras which is the origin of the word Darai. Darais is also mentioned in the Mahabharat, Manusmriti and Haribanshapurana.

References

Ethnic groups in Nepal